Doña Cresencia "Donya" Reyes Tesoro (born April 5, 1992) is a Filipina politician serving as the mayor of San Manuel, Tarlac since 2019. She previously served as the municipality's vice mayor from 2016 to 2019, and was a councilor from 2013 to 2016.

Early life 
Her father, Benjamin "Bening" D. Tesoro (died 2022), was a former military officer who served as mayor of San Manuel, Tarlac and previously served as her vice mayor.

She graduated high school from OB Montessori Center in Greenhills, San Juan. After receiving a Bachelor of Arts degree in Communication from Miriam College, she immediately ran for councilor in her town. She received a Master's degree in Public Management in 2018 from the Ateneo School of Government while she was the vice mayor of San Manuel.

Political career 
Before she became mayor, she served as a Municipal Councilor from 2013 to 2016 and Municipal Vice Mayor from 2016 to 2019 of San Manuel. 

She also served as the Executive Vice President of the Lady Local Legislators League (4L) of the Philippines from 2016 to 2019.

She made it to the list of the "Millenial Mayors" of Mega Manila when she was elected in the 2019 national election and made it to People Asia Magazine’s Women of Style and Substance for the year 2020.

References 

1991 births
Living people
Mayors of places in Tarlac
21st-century Filipino women politicians
21st-century Filipino politicians
Partido Federal ng Pilipinas politicians
Nationalist People's Coalition politicians
Lakas–CMD politicians
Women mayors of places in the Philippines